Eastern Passage is a provincial electoral district in the Canadian province of Nova Scotia that came into effect at the 2021 Nova Scotia general election. It elects one member to the Legislative Assembly of Nova Scotia.

The riding was created by the 2019 provincial redistribution out of part of Cole Harbour-Eastern Passage.

The riding contains the communities of Cow Bay, Eastern Passage, Shearwater, McNabs Island, and the Dartmouth neighbourhood of Imperoyal in the Halifax Regional Municipality.

Members of the Legislative Assembly 
This riding has elected the following MLAs:

Election results

References

Nova Scotia provincial electoral districts